Kampong Sungai Liang is a village in Belait District, Brunei, about  from the district's principal town Kuala Belait and  from the oil town Seria. The population was 910 in 2016. It is one of the villages within Mukim Liang. The postcode is KC1135.

Geography 
The village is one of the settlements along the country's coast with the South China Sea. The neighbouring primary settlements include Kampong Telisai in Tutong District to the north-east and Lumut to the south-west.

The Sungai Liang beach is located on the coast of the village. Even though there are huts on the beach, it nevertheless is not a commercial one.

The river basin is a vital fishing spot, where freshwater and saltwater meet.

Infrastructures 
The village is home to Sungai Liang Health Centre, the sole community health centre in Mukim Liang. It also has an emergency ambulance service.

The Sungai Liang Police Station is the sole police station in the mukim.

On 14 September 1990, the Sungai Liang Fire Department was officially opened. Despite it being built in Kampong Lilas, it is still named after the village. It housed the Fire and Rescue Department (JBP) Operation Branch 'B'.

Education 
Sungai Liang Primary School is the village's government primary school. It also houses the Sungai Liang Religious School (school for the country's Islamic religious primary education).

When the Sungai Liang and Lumut community saw the need to construct a school that would provide their kids access to a primary education, Chung Lian School was established in 1953 and would later be opened in August 1955 with 27 pupils and a teacher serving as the principal. Since then, Chung Lian School has been around to educate children and give back to the local community.

Religion 
Kampong Sungai Liang Mosque is the village mosque; it was inaugurated on 8 November 1980.

Recreation 
The recreational park offers tourist amenities such picnic areas, jogging, hiking, and nature appreciation pathways leading to various park locations. The park is frequently used for teaching and research by the Forestry Department and other educational organizations. A small lake, a floating hut, shelter huts, and open spaces perfect for outdoor recreational activities are some of the park's additional features.

Brunei Forestry Museum is built in 1986. It is one of Brunei's earliest colonnaded structures. The museum was first built in the middle of 1985 out of wood with a thatched roof. The museum serves as the public's primary source of forestry knowledge and showcases the natural history of Brunei forestry, the riches of the country's woods, as well as vintage tools and traditional forest goods.

Industry

Petrochemical 

The Brunei Methanol Company (BMC) owns a methanol plant in Sungai Liang. The BMC plant was the largest investment done outside of the oil and gas and LNG industry. The plant was noted to have the capability to produce up to 850,000 tonnes of methanol per year. The project was part of the Wawasan Brunei 2035 goals on diversing Brunei's economy and reduce the dependence on oil and gas industry.

There will also be a demo hydrogenation plant in the area; it is currently in construction and expected to be completed by 2019. The product will be exported for the Japanese domestic market; the first batch is expected to be utilised as fuel for 3,000 cars used during the Tokyo Summer Olympic Games in 2020.

Fertilizer 
The Brunei Fertilizer Industries (BFI) owns a fertilizer plant is also planned to be built in the site; the plant is developed by the German conglomerate ThyssenKrupp and expected to operate by 2021.

Agriculture 
Paddy plantations are another source of industry from the agricultural sector in the area.

References 

Belait District
Sungai Liang